The Athens War Museum, established on July 18, 1975, is the museum of the Greek Armed Forces. Its purpose is the exhibition of weapon artifacts and the relevant research in the history of war. It covers the history of war in all ages. The museums' collections include the collection of the Greek Army, with artifacts from other civilizations such as Ancient China and Ancient Japan. In 1964, the Hellenic State decided to found the War Museum, wishing to honor all those who fought for Greece and its freedom. The design of the museum was undertaken by a team of distinguished scientists, headed by Professor  of the National Technical University of Athens (N.T.U.A). On July 18, 1975, the President of the Hellenic Republic H.E. Constantine Tsatsos and the Minister of National Defense Evangelos Averoff-Tositsas inaugurated the museum. Its various activities include the publication of books, the establishment and maintenance of monuments and memorials and the aid to services and agencies all over Greece. The Museum's exhibition areas are distributed over four levels (floors) and present images of Greek history from antiquity to the present. The museum's centerpieces are weaponry from wars in which Greece was involved.

The War Museum has established Museum Branches at Nauplion, Peloponnese (1988), Chania, Crete (1995), Tripoli, Peloponnese (1997) and Thessaloniki (2000). After building the Hellenic Air Force Museum, some airplanes were brought to this museum.

Gallery

See also 
:Category:Military and war museums in Greece

References

External links 

 

Military and war museums in Greece
War Museum
Museums established in 1975
1975 establishments in Greece